is a Japanese professional baseball player for the Hiroshima Toyo Carp of Nippon Professional Baseball (NPB). He previously played for the Yomiuri Giants.

Career
He was named the 2010 Central League Rookie of the Year.

In , Yomiuri Giants selected him with the first selection. On November 23, he agreed with a one-year contract.

On December 20, 2018, he was sent to Hiroshima Toyo Carp during a trade for Yoshihiro Maru.

International career
He represented Japan national baseball team at the 2006 Asian Games in Doha and 2013 World Baseball Classic. And also, on November 16, 2018, he was selected Yomiuri Giants roster at the 2018 MLB Japan All-Star Series exhibition game against MLB All-Stars.

References

External links

NBP

1984 births
Living people
Asian Games medalists in baseball
Asian Games silver medalists for Japan
Baseball people from Saga Prefecture
Baseball players at the 2006 Asian Games
Hiroshima Toyo Carp players
Japanese baseball players
Medalists at the 2006 Asian Games
Nihon University alumni
Nippon Professional Baseball outfielders
Nippon Professional Baseball Rookie of the Year Award winners
Yomiuri Giants players
2013 World Baseball Classic players